The 2016–17 season was Reading's 146th year in existence and fourth consecutive season in the Championship, and covers the period from 1 July 2016 to 30 June 2017. Reading finished 3rd in the league, qualifying for the play-offs, eventually losing to Huddersfield Town in the final on penalties.

Season review

Pre-season
On 26 May, Reading announced a pre-season friendly against local rivals Swindon Town on 19 July, and against Boreham Wood on 3 July. The following day the club released manager Brian McDermott of his duties, whilst also announcing a pre-season friendly against Premier League side Bournemouth. On 31 May, Reading announced their fourth pre-season friendly, an away trip to Lincoln City on July 16, 2016.

On 13 June, Reading announced Jaap Stam as their new manager, replacing Brian McDermott who was fired at the end of May. Four days later Reading extended their sponsorship deal with Carabao Daeng for another three seasons.

On 21 June, Reading announced that Academy Manager Eamonn Dolan had died following a battle with cancer.

Reading announced on 7 July that they would be travelling to Oosterbeek, Netherlands for a weeklong training camp, with a friendly against Saudi Professional League side Al-Taawoun on 15 July. This meant Martin Kuhl would manage the fixture against Lincoln City on 16 July 2016 as the rest of the squad would be returning home on that same day.

On 26 July, Reading announced that they had accepted an invitation to enter their Category One Academy in the revamped EFL Trophy, being drawn against Bristol Rovers, Portsmouth and Yeovil Town the following day. On 28 July, the U23 side wear drawn against Everton, Athletic Bilbao and Hertha BSC in the Premier League International Cup.

Transfers
Following the conclusion of the 2015–16 season, Reading announced on 9 May 2016 that they would not be renewing the contracts of Anton Ferdinand, Hal Robson-Kanu, Simon Cox, Nana Owusu, Pierce Sweeney, Lewis Collins, Noor Husin, Hammad Lawal, Samúel Friðjónsson, Conor Shaughnessy and Bogdan Vashchuk. Friðjónsson went on to sign a three-and-a-half-year contract with Norwegian Tippeligaen side Vålerenga on 16 June 2016, with Cox joining Southend United on 16 July 2016 and Sweeney joining Exeter City on 28 July 2016.

Also on 9 May 2016, Reading offered new contracts to Dominic Hyam, Robert Dickie, Shane Griffin, Sean Long, Aaron Kuhl, Liam Kelly, Zak Jules and George Legg, as well as Under-18 players Omar Richards, Harrison Bennett, Ryan East, Sam Smith, Luke Southwood, Billy Collings and Joe Tupper.

On 25 May 2016, Reading announced that they had signed Danzell Gravenberch on a three-year contract from FC Dordrecht, with the transfer to be confirmed upon the opening of the transfer window on 1 July 2016. During June, Reading were linked with Joey van den Berg, Tyler Blackett, and Tim Matavž. On 28 June, Van den Berg signed a two-year contract, which was completed upon the opening of the transfer window on 1 July.

As well as the transfers of Gravenberch and van den Berg being completed on 1 July, Reading announced that youngsters Lewis Ward, Zak Jules, George Legg, Sean Long, Shane Griffin, Liam Kelly, Aaron Kuhl, Robert Dickie, Dominic Hyam, Ryan East, Harrison Bennett, Joe Tupper, Billy Collings, Omar Richards, Luke Southward and Thomas McIntyre had all signed deals to stay with the club.

On 4 July, forward Rowan Liburd left the club on a permanent transfer, joining Stevenage for an undisclosed fee. Four days later, 8 July, Reading signed Joseph Mendes from Le Havre on a two-year contract for an undisclosed fee.

Aaron Tshibola left the club for Aston Villa on 10 July, for an undisclosed fee. The following day it was announced that Finnish goalkeeper Anssi Jaakkola had signed from Ajax Cape Town on a two-year deal. On 14 July, Reading signed John Swift to a three-year contract following his release from Chelsea, with Roy Beerens joining two days later on a three-year contract from Hertha BSC.

On 28 July, youngster Sean Long joined Cambridge United on a six-month loan deal, with Yakou Méïte joining on a three-year deal from Paris Saint-Germain the following day.

August
Reading started the season with a 1–0 home win over Preston North End on 6 August thanks to a goal from John Swift on his debut, before following it up with a 2–0 victory over Plymouth Argyle in the EFL Cup three days later, with goals from Joey van den Berg and Roy Beerens. Reading's first defeat of the season came on 13 August, where they lost 0–2 to Wolverhampton Wanderers at Molineux. Reading suffered their second defeat of the season on 17 August, a 4–1 away defeat to Newcastle United.
Reading came from behind to earn a 2–2 draw against Brighton & Hove Albion on 20 August, and a further 2–2 draw, against Milton Keynes Dons on 23 August, saw Reading advance to the Third Round of the EFL Cup after winning 4–2 on penalties.

Reading's last match of the month was on 27 August, where they saw a 0–1 away win at Cardiff after an 89th-minute goal by Yann Kermorgant.

Transfers 
On 3 August, Paolo Hurtado returned to Vitória de Guimarães on a season-long loan, Lewis Ward joined Margate until 3 January 2017, George Legg joined Hungerford Town on a season-long loan, and Oliver Norwood moved to Brighton & Hove Albion on a three-year contract for an undisclosed fee. On 5 August, winger Callum Harriott signed a three-year contract, moving from Charlton Athletic for an undisclosed fee.

Reading loaned Craig Tanner to Plymouth Argyle, and signed Liechtenstein international midfielder Sandro Wieser to a three-year contract the next day.
On 19 August, youngster Aaron Kuhl moved to National League side Boreham Wood on loan until 28 January 2017, whilst defender Liam Moore became the club's tenth summer signing, joining the club from Leicester City the next day on a four-year contract. Tyler Blackett was signed to a three-year deal on 22 August.

On 25 August, Robert Dickie returned to Cheltenham Town on loan until 2 January 2017. Goalkeeper Jonathan Bond joined Gillingham on loan on 26 August, until 7 January 2017.

Near the end of the August, Reading where linked with a loan-move for Ghanaian Captain Asamoah Gyan from Shanghai SIPG, with the striker undertaking a medical at the club on 29 August. The following day, Reading backed out of the deal due to Gyan failing a medical.

On transfer deadline day, 31 August, Jack Stacey joined Exeter City on loan until 23 January 2017, Tarique Fosu joined Colchester United on loan until 7 January 2017, and Dominic Hyam joined Portsmouth until 8 January 2017.

During the summer transfer window, Portuguese youngster Lisandro Semedo left the club, joining AEZ Zakakiou in the Cypriot First Division.

September
Reading's first match in September was a 2–1 league win against Ipswich at the Madejski Stadium on 9 September, in which all three goals came from penalties.  Reading's two were taken by Garath McCleary and Danny Williams, who scored in first- and second-half injury time respectively. A midweek home tie against Birmingham on 13 September gave Reading one point from the 0–0 draw, and a 1–2 away win at Barnsley the following weekend saw Reading move to eighth place in the Championship, drawing on points with sixth-place Brentford. Reading progressed to the fourth round of the EFL Cup after a 1–2 away win against Brighton and Hove Albion on 20 September. The draw for the round took place on 21 September, with Reading drawn against Arsenal.

Reading saw a third consecutive win—and a continuation of their eight-match unbeaten run—on 24 September with a 1–0 home win against Huddersfield, with Reading rising to fourth in the league.

At the end of September, midfielder Érico Sousa joined the club on trial, featuring in the clubs U23 Development League fixture against Derby County on 26 September.

Reading's last game of the month was away at Brentford, which also saw the eight-game unbeaten run end after a 4–1 defeat.

October
On 1 October Reading hosted Derby County in a match that saw four former Reading players—Matěj Vydra, Alex Pearce, Nick Blackman and Chris Baird—return to the Madejski Stadium. Vydra gave Derby the lead in the second half, although Reading equalised through George Evans in the 90th minute.  The draw continued Reading's undefeated run at home. A further draw came after the international break, when on 15 October a 1–1 result at Queens Park Rangers took Reading to 7th in the league. A home loss on 18 October against Aston Villa brought the end of Reading's unbeaten home run.  Despite holding a 1–1 draw since the early stages of the second half, Reading conceded a penalty in the 90th minute, with the resultant goal giving Aston Villa their first away win in over a year.  Reading's final two league games of the month came on 22 and 29 October, where they beat Rotherham United 0–1 and Nottingham Forest 2–0.  Reading were knocked out of the EFL Cup on 25 October following a 2–0 defeat to Arsenal at the Emirates Stadium.

On 6 October 2016 Icelandic U19 defender Sindri Scheving joined Cirencester Town on a one-month loan deal.

November
Reading began November with a 0–3 away win at Wigan Athletic, a result which saw them move up to 4th in the Championship. After the November international break, Reading recorded their fourth and fifth consecutive league wins, with 3–0 and 2–1 home victories against Burton Albion and Bristol City respectively, which saw them move up to 3rd in the league.

December
On 2 December, young Scottish defender Zak Jules joined Braintree Town on a month-long loan deal. Reading's winning run ended on 3 December with a 5–0 away loss to Fulham, during which Danny Williams received a red card; Reading however remained at third place. On 10 December Reading returned to winning form with a 2–1 home win against Sheffield Wednesday, although this was short-lived with a 2–0 away loss at Leeds United three days later.

Two consecutive wins followed, with a 2–3 away victory at Blackburn Rovers on 17 December and a 3–1 home victory against Norwich City on 26 December, results which saw Reading retain their 3rd-place position. Reading's final match of 2016 was at home against Fulham on 30 December.  The scoreless game was abandoned by officials at half time due to dense fog, with the rescheduled match due to take place on 24 January 2017.

On 23 December, Icelandic youth international Axel Andrésson joined Bath City on loan until 25 February 2017, whilst academy graduate Liam Kelly signed a new contract, keeping him at the club until the summer of 2019, on 30 December.

January
Reading started 2017 with a 2–3 away win at Bristol City on 3 January. Trailing 2–0 until the final 20 minutes of the match, Reading scored three goals—including a stoppage-time strike by Kermogant—to ensure victory.
On 5 January 2017, Ali Al-Habsi extended his contract with the club until the end of the 2018–19 season. Reading's FA Cup third round match against Manchester United took place at Old Trafford on 7 January. Manchester United took the lead in the 7th minute, when Wayne Rooney scored his 249th goal for the club, levelling the club record set by Bobby Charlton. Further goals from Anthony Martial and Marcus Rashford secured United's place in the fourth round with a 4–0 victory. On 12 January, Reading suffered their second home defeat of the season, when former Royal Jamie Mackie scored for Queens Park Rangers in their 0–1 victory. On 17 January, Garath McCleary extended his contract with the club until the summer of 2020. Reading had a second consecutive league defeat on 21 January, when they lost 3–2 away to Derby. Reading returned to winning form on 24 January at the rescheduled home fixture against Fulham.  Beerens scored from the rebound of a John Swift penalty, and Al Habsi saved a 90th-minute Fulham penalty to give Reading a 1–0 win. Reading won again on 28 January at home to Cardiff City, which included goals from Swift and Kermogant. The month ended with a 0–1 away win at Birmingham City on 31 January.

Transfers
On 5 January 2017, Reading were linked with a move for Liverpool defender Tiago Ilori, whilst Sean Long joined Lincoln City on loan for the remainder of the 2016–17 season.
On 12 January 2017, Tarique Fosu extended his loan deal with Colchester United until the end of the season. Tanner extended his stay with Plymouth Argyle until the end of the season on 16 January 2017, with Billy Collings moving to Brighton & Hove Albion the following day for an undisclosed fee. Ilori's move was announced on 18 January, with Jake Cooper joining Millwall on loan until the end of the season the following day, Jake Sheppard joining Dagenham & Redbridge on a youth-loan deal until the end of the season and Harrison Bennett joined Margate on a month-long youth-loan deal on 20 January.

On 21 January, Scottish youth international forward, Harry Cardwell, joined Brighton & Hove Albion on loan for the rest of the season, with Jack Stacey extending his loan-deal with Exeter City until the end of the season on 23 January. The following day Niall Keown joined Scottish Premiership side Partick Thistle on loan for the remainder of the season, whilst Zak Jules also headed north of the border on 27 January, joining Motherwell on loan until the end of the season.

Reading completed the signing of Romanian International Adrian Popa, on a three-and-a-half year contract on 30 January, with Jordon Mutch, Reece Oxford and Lewis Grabban all joining on loan until the end of the season the following day.

Also on Transfer Deadline Day, Stuart Moore joined Luton Town and Dominic Samuel joined Ipswich Town on loan for the rest of the season.

February
February began with a 2–2 away draw with Ipswich Town; on the same day Shane Griffin signed for Cork City. On 9 February, Jaap Stam was nominated for January's manager of the month, winning it the following day. Also on 10 February, Yann Kermorgant signed a new one-year extension to his contract, keeping him at Reading until the summer of 2018.

On 11 February Reading again drew, hosting Barnsley in a goalless match.

On 13 February, Reading announced that academy players Ramarni Medford-Smith, Teddy Howe, Jordan Holsgrove and Tyler Frost, had all signed their first pro-contract with the club. The following day Reading returned to winning form with a 3–2 home win against Brentford.

On 17 February, Lewis Ward returned to Margate on an initial one-month loan deal, and Harrison Bennett extended his loan for another month.

Reading's final two matches of the month, on 21 and 25 February, were both away losses to Huddersfield (1–0) and Brighton and Hove Albion (3–0) respectively.

On 25 February 2017, youngster Terence Vancooten joined Basingstoke Town on loan for the rest of the season, with Bath City extending Axel Andrésson's loan deal until the end of the season on 28 February.

March
Owing to the international break, Reading only played four matches in March. On 4 March, Reading beat Wolverhampton Wanderers 2–0 at home, before holding then-league leaders Newcastle United to a 0–0 home draw on 7 March. Reading's only loss that month came on 11 March, with a 3–0 away defeat to Preston North End.

George Legg was recalled from his loan deal with Hungerford Town early, on 16 March, with Lewis Ward joining Hungerford Town the next day on loan until the end of the season. The same day, Reading travelled to Sheffield Wednesday where a 0–2 away win saw Adrian Popa run the length of the pitch in stoppage time to seal the victory.

On 23 March, Dominic Hyam joined Aldershot Town until the end of the season.

On 27 March, John Swift was nominated for the EFL Young Player of the Year.

April
Reading moved to 4th on 1 April after a 1–0 home win against Leeds saw the two teams swap league positions. A 3–1 home win against Blackburn Rovers on 4 April saw Reading briefly move to 3rd place prior to Huddersfield Town's 3–0 victory over Norwich City the following evening, which pushed Reading back to 4th. Reading's next match was a 7–1 away defeat to Norwich City on 8 April, in a game that saw six of Norwich's goals (as well as Kermogant's goal for Reading) scored before half time. Despite the loss, Reading retained their league position. The following day, the club announced that they had received conditional approval from the English Football League (EFL) for the takeover of the club by Dai Yongge and Dai Xiu Li.
Two matches were played over the Easter bank holiday weekend. At the first, away to Aston Villa on 15 April, Reading returned to winning form with a 1–3 win. A consecutive victory occurred at the Madejski Stadium just 48 hours later, when Reading came from behind to beat already-relegated Rotherham United 2–1.

On 22 April Reading lost 3–2 away to Nottingham Forest, remaining in third place pending the result of Huddersfield Town's midweek game against Wolverhampton Wanderers.

A 1–0 home win against Wigan Athletic on 29 April guaranteed Reading's place in the play-offs.

May
On 4 May, Kermorgant was nominated for April's Championship Player of the Month, winning the award the following day.

Reading's final league game of the season was a 2–4 away win at Burton Albion on 7 May, which confirmed their play-off semi-final opponents would be Fulham. The away leg of this took place at Craven Cottage on 13 May, ending in a 1–1 draw.  Jordan Obita opened the scoring in the second half, although Fulham equalised just over 10 minutes later. McShane received a red card for a high challenge, which suspended him for the upcoming home leg and potentially the play-off final.

On 12 May, Reading announced that they had offered new contracts to Jake Sheppard, Tarique Fosu, Zak Jules, Lewis Ward, Ryan East. Andy Rinomhota, Andrija Novakovich, Sam Smith and Luke Southwood, whilst George Legg and Axel Andrésson had already signed new deals. On the same day, Ethan Coleman, Tom Holmes, Danny Loader and Kosta Sparta signed their first professional deals with the club whilst Liam Driscoll, Ben House, Joel Rollinson and Ade Shokunbi were all also offered professional contracts.

The club also announced on 12 May that Harrison Bennett, Aaron Kuhl, Stuart Moore, Joe Tupper, Terence Vancooten, Sean Long, Craig Tanner, Jack Denton, Dominic Hyam and Harry Cardwell would be leaving the club on the expiration of their contract.

On 16 May, Kermorgant scored the only goal in Reading's 1–0 win over Fulham to progress to the Championship Play-off Final. The same evening, the club announced that the EFL had approved the majority share takeover from Chinese investors Dai Yongge and Dai Xiuli.

On 29 May, Reading played in the EFL Championship play-off final against Huddersfield Town, drawing 0–0 in both regular and extra time before losing 4–3 in a penalty shootout. The defeat meant Reading's 2017–18 season would be their fifth successive season of Championship football.

Transfers

In

 Gravenberch and van den Berg's transfers were announced on the above dates, but were not finalised until 1 July.

Out

Loans in

Loans out

Released

Trial

Squad

Left club during season

Friendlies

Competitions

Championship

League table

Results summary

Results by matchday

Matches

Play-offs

EFL Cup

FA Cup

Professional U23 Development League

Table

Results

Premier League Cup

Group stage

Knockout stage

Final

Premier League International Cup

Group stage

EFL Trophy

Group stage

Knockout stage

Squad statistics

Appearances and goals

|-
|colspan="14"|Players away from the club on loan:
|-
|colspan="14"|Players who left Reading during the season:
|}

Goal scorers

Clean sheets

Disciplinary record

U21/23 statistics

Appearances and goals

|-
|colspan="14"|Players away from the club on loan:
|-
|colspan="14"|Players who left Reading during the season:

|}

Goal scorers

Disciplinary record

Awards

Manager of the Month

Player of the Month

Young Player of the Month

Young Player of the Year

Notes

References

Match reports 

Reading
Reading F.C. seasons